Almas del Silencio (English: Souls from the Silence) is the seventh studio album and fifth Spanish language album recorded by Puerto Rican performer Ricky Martin. This is the first Spanish album release since 1998's Vuelve. It was released by Sony Discos and Columbia Records on May 20, 2003. The album was released in 38 non-Hispanic countries and reached top ten in Spain, Switzerland, Italy, Portugal, Norway and Finland.

Background and development 
Martin initially planned to release an English-language album, which was supposed to be his first complete work in the field of songwriting. He changed his mind: 

Martin noted about the language: "Many countries are releasing [this album] simply as Ricky Martin's next album, period. They know me as a Latino who recorded an album in English. And the next English-language album will be Ricky Martin's next album, period."

Martin said of the new album: "I really needed to go back to focus, to my center, to the beginning. I had the need to search within, and really dig deep, and find those emotions that, because of the adrenaline and the euphoria that I lived for a couple of years, were probably sabotaged." Therefore he asked the songwriters for tracks that "reflect his own state of mind, expressing his yearning for his native Puerto Rico and for the simpler things in life."

Singles 
"Tal Vez" was released as the main single of Almas del Silencio  on March 17, 2003, it was written by the Venezuelan singer-songwriter Franco De Vita, who wrote Vuelve, the title track of the last album in Spanish from Martin. "Tal Vez" is a radical ballad that never turns cloying. The single debuted at No. 1 on the US Hot Latin Songs, It was the first time that list has seen a No. 1 debut since February 7, 1998, when Los Temerarios "Porque Te Conoci" (Why Did I Meet You) bowed in the top slot, then spent 11 weeks on top of the Hot Latin Songs. "Tal Vez" also debuted at No. 1 on the Latin Pop Airplay (thirteen weeks on top) and at No. 4 on the list of Tropical Airplay (weeks later it reached number one). It also reached number seventy-four on the Billboard Hot 100, thanks to its seventy-three peak on the Hot 100 Airplay. "Tal Vez" topped the Billboard Top Latin Songs Year-End Chart. Also reached number 1 in Argentina, Chile, Central America, Mexico and Venezuela. Martin performed "Tal Vez" at the Latin Billboard Music Awards on May 8 in Miami.

"Jaleo" it was the first international single and the second single from the album. It was released on May 2, 2003 internationally and in July 2003 in the United States. "Jaleo", a Spanish word with various definitions, but it basically means "to clap" or, rather, yell out words of excitement such as "¡olé!" and "¡eso!" usually during flamenco and merengue performances. The song has reached number one on the Billboard Hot Latin Song and number two on the Latin Pop Songs. He also entered the charts in Belgium, Germany, France, Norway, Sweden and Japan with the single achieving the top 10 positions in Spain (# 1 for four weeks), Italy and Sweden and Top 30 entries in Denmark, Holland and Switzerland.

"Asignatura Pendiente" was released as the third single on August 12, 2003. The song was written by Ricardo Arjona and produced by Tommy Torres, is about the artist's experiences, whatever it may be, not only Ricky Martin, but in the mouth of the Puerto Rican singer. This refers to his beginnings with the famous group Menudo", how success has influenced his life and the nostalgia he feels far from his native Puerto Rico, which also applies to Ricardo Arjona, due to his ex-wife and very good friends of the island. In "Asignatura Pendiente" lovelessness, sacrifice and lived rewards are evidenced. The song has reached number five on the Billboard Hot Latin Song and number four on the Latin Pop Songs.

"Juramento" it was the second international single and the fourth single from the album. It was released on September 15, 2003. The Spanglish version is called "Juramento (The Way to Love)". The song reached number eleven in Spain, number forty-five in Italy, number fifty-seven in Switzerland and number ninety-two in Germany.

"Y Todo Queda en Nada" is the fifth single from the album. It was released as a promotional single on December 2, 2003 in Latin territories. The song reached number one on the Hot Latin Songs in the United States and stayed at the top for one week. It arrived at peak number nine on the Billboard Bubbling Under Hot 100, it also peaked at number two on the Latin Pop Airplay and Tropical Songs. In 2004 the song he stayed with number 4 of Billboard Top Latin Songs Year-End Chart. On February 26, in Miami, Martin performed "Y todo Queda en Nada" along with "Jaleo" at the Premio Lo Nuestro.

Commercial performance
Almas del Silencio released by Sony Discos debuted at number one on the US Top Latin Albums and stayed there for six weeks. The album has also made the highest charting debut on the Billboard 200 (# 12) of any Spanish-language album in the SoundScan era, selling more than 65,000 copies the first week.

In total, he sold 261,000 copies in the US. It was certified 4× Platinum Latin award by the Recording Industry Association of America (RIAA), indicating shipments of over 400,000 copies in the country. Outside the United States, it was certified Platinum in Spain and Argentina, and Gold in Mexico and Switzerland. The album has sold over two million copies worldwide.

Awards and nominations

Track listing

Charts

Weekly charts

Year-end charts

Decade-end charts

Certifications and sales

Release history

See also
 List of best-selling Latin albums

References

2003 albums
Ricky Martin albums
Spanish-language albums
Sony Discos albums
Columbia Records albums
Albums produced by Tommy Torres
Albums produced by Emilio Estefan
Albums produced by Estéfano